The Kilburn Building is a building on the Oxford Road in Manchester which is home to the Department of Computer Science at the University of Manchester. The building was designed by the Building Design Partnership and completed in 1972, with three storeys in a square shape, measuring 76 by 76 metres. The building was formerly known as the Computer Building changing its name in 2001 in honour of Tom Kilburn who died in the same year.

Architecture and history
The Pevsner Architectural Guide describes the Kilburn building as a "big aggressive box of brick pier and vertical window strips" which has also been likened in appearance to a giant brick Central processing unit (CPU) heat sink. The second floor features an Auguste Perret style paved piazza which initially featured a fibreglass structure known as the floating point zero.

Up until 2015, the building was connected to Manchester Business School, via the Precinct Centre and Bridge on the North Side of the building over the Oxford Road (demolished in 2015). To the South, the building was connected by another pedestrian walkway (referred to as a dismal corridor in Pevsner) to the Mathematics Tower, Manchester which was demolished in 2005.

The pedestrian walkways initially formed part of a futuristic but ultimately unsuccessful vision of streets in the sky to link Manchester Oxford Road railway station and out to the Hulme Crescents in Hulme and also to Ardwick.

The building was extended on the east side by the information technology (IT) building which was officially opened by Anne, Princess Royal in 1988.

Some of the first computers housed in the building were the CDC 7600 and the 1906AICT 1900 series from International Computers Limited (ICL).

The cornbrook, a culverted river which drains the urban area South of the River Medlock, flows under the Kilburn building on its way from Gorton to the Manchester Ship Canal at the Pomona Docks.

Gallery
Images of the Kilburn building can be seen in the gallery below:

References

Buildings and structures in Manchester
Buildings and structures completed in 1972
University of Manchester